Siempre Contigo may refer to:

 Siempre Contigo (Lucero album), 1995
 Siempre Contigo (José José album), 1986